The Diocese of Wondurba is an Anglican Diocese of the Province of the Episcopal Church of South Sudan and Sudan in South Sudan. The diocese is centered on the region of Central Equatoria.

The Bishop is Matthew Taban Peter.

References

Wondurba
Anglicanism in South Sudan
Religious organisations based in South Sudan